An Evening of New York Songs and Stories is a live album by the American singer-songwriter Suzanne Vega. It was recorded in March 2019 at Café Carlyle in the Upper East Side, Manhattan, New York City. This recording was released on September 11, 2020. Throughout the recordings, longtime co-worker Gerry Leonard played guitar, Jeff Allen was the bassist, and Jamie Edwards played the keyboard.

Track listing 
 "Marlene on the Wall" – 4:19
 "Luka" – 3:10
 "Conversation: So how many people are here from out of town?" – 0:45
 "New York Is a Woman" – 3:16
 "Conversation: This next song takes place on 59th Street..." – 0:39
 "Frank and Ava" – 2:43
 "Conversation: So I myself came to New York City when I was 2½ years old..." – 0:27
 "Gypsy" – 4:28
 "Freeze Tag" – 2:53
 "Pornographer's Dream" – 3:39
 "Conversation: This next song is called New York Is My Destination..." – 0:22
 "New York Is My Destination" – 3:20
 "Conversation: The first time I saw Lou Reed..." – 0:51
 "Walk on the Wild Side" – 4:16
 "Ludlow Street" – 3:34
 "Cracking" – 3:04
 "Conversation: And now we've got a song about those times" – 0:07
 "Some Journey" – 4:49
 "Conversation: I'm gonna close with this song..." – 0:10
 "Tom's Diner" – 5:04
 "Conversation: Would you like another one?" – 0:17
 "Anniversary" – 3:04
 "Tombstone" – 3:02
 "Thin Man" – 4:04

Charts

References 

2020 live albums
Suzanne Vega albums